Harispattuwa Pradeshiya Sabha (Sinhala: හාරිස්පත්තුව ප්‍රාදේශීය සභාව) is the local authority for Harispattuwa Divisional Secretariat Division in Kandy district, Sri Lanka. Sri Lanka Podujana Peramuna currently holds the power by winning the 2018 Sri Lankan local elections.

Wards 
2018 election introduced a new electoral system to ensure each local community has its own representative. Harispattuwa region was divided into 22 wards based on the existing Grama niladhari division boundaries and winner from each ward elected directly to the local authority.

 Medawala (මැදවල)
 Attaragama (අත්තරගම)
 Gonigoda (ගෝනිගොඩ)
 Hedeniya (හෑදෙනිය)
 Karanduwawala (කරඬුවාවල)
 Hiriyalagammana (හිරියාලගම්මන)
 Thiththapajjala (තිත්තපජ්ජල)
 Hapugoda (හපුගොඩ)
 Ranawana (රණවන)
 Uduwawala (උඩුවාවල)
 Nugawela (නුගවෙල) 
 Kulugammana (කුළුගම්මන)
 Uguressapitiya (උගුරැස්සපිටිය)
 Senarathgama (සෙනරත්ගම)
 Inigala (ඉනිගල) 
 Polwatta (පොල්වත්ත)
 Hamangoda North (හමංගොඩ උතුර)
 Gohagoda (ගොහාගොඩ)
 Hamangoda South (හමංගොඩ දකුණ)
 Halloluwa (හල්ඔළුව)
 Yatihalagala Udugama (යටිහලගල උඩුගම)
 Yatihalagala Pallegama (යටිහලගල පල්ලේගම)

Election Results

2018 local government election

2011 local government election

2006 local government election

References 

Local authorities in Central Province, Sri Lanka